HMS Berkeley was a  of the British Royal Navy. She was sold to the Hellenic Navy in 2001 and was commissioned as HS Kallisto. On 27 October 2020, she was cut in two in a collision with a container ship.

Description
The Hunt class was designed as being capable of both conventional minesweeping and minehunting, and following on from the success of the experimental glass-reinforced plastic (GRP)-hulled minesweeper/minehunter , were also built from GRP in order to reduce their magnetic signature, being the largest GRP-hulled ships built at the time of construction.

Displacement was  normal and  full load. In addition, the ships were fitted with three Foden  diesel alternators to generate electrical power for ship's systems.

The original design armament for the ships was a single 40 mm gun, which was later replaced by a 30 mm Oerlikon KCB cannon on a stabilised DS30 mount, with Berkeley being fitted with the DS30 by 1990. Two 20 mm Oerlikon cannon could also be fitted. For minehunting, the ships would use Type 193M sonar to locate potential mines, which could then be investigated and if necessary destroyed by two PAP-104 remotely controlled submersibles or divers. The ship also carried magnetic, acoustic or Oropesa sweeps. The ship had a crew of 45 (6 officers and 39 other ranks).

History
She was the twelfth of the thirteen Hunt-class vessels, and was built as Yard No.4256 by Vosper Thorneycroft shipbuilders at Woolston, Southampton.

Berkeley was commissioned on 14 January 1988, and after sea trials, was assigned to the 1st Mine Countermeasures Squadron based at Rosyth, Scotland. In 1990, she was part of the 3rd Mine Countermeasures Squadron. She took part in mine clearance operations in the Persian Gulf following the 1st Gulf War and later was involved in fishery protection duties in UK waters.

She was sold to the Hellenic Navy, then handed over and commissioned as Kallisto, after the mythological nymph of that name, on 28 February 2001.

On 27 October 2020, after sailing from Salamis Naval Base, HS Kallisto was severely damaged in a collision in the Saronic Gulf with the Portuguese-flagged container ship , which had just departed from the port of Piraeus. Kallisto was cut in two, with two of her 27 crew injured, and the stern section sank. Her bow section developed a severe list and was taken in tow for the naval base.

References

Hunt-class mine countermeasures vessels
1986 ships
Kallisto
Maritime incidents in 2020
Ships built in Southampton
Shipwrecks in the Aegean Sea